İstemihan is a common masculine Turkish given name. It is composed of two Turkish words: "İstemi" and "Han". "İstemi" means "Conquerror of the Sky" and it is a given name on its own whereas "Han" means "Ruler" or "King". Thus, "İstemihan" means "Conquerror of the Sky" or "Ruler of the Sky".

People
 İstemihan Kapar, a Turkish author (see Turkish Wikipedia article).
 İstemi Khan, the Yabgu (ruler) of the western part of the Göktürks, the Western Turkic Khaganate (Celestial Turks).
 İstemihan Taviloğlu, a Turkish composer and a music educator.
 İstemihan Talay, former Minister of Culture of Turkey .

Turkish masculine given names